In 2010, the self-proclaimed "Kabyle Provisional Government" in exile (ANAVAD - Anavaḍ Aqvayli Uεḍil) was created with Ferhat Mehenni as its leader . 

The ANAVAD wanted a new flag to represent the Kabyle nation and so on 19 November 2012, a search for a Kabyle flag was announced by the Council Ministers of the ANAVAD and on 20 February 2013, a call for proposals on the Kabyle flag was created. 

The ANAVAD wanted the Kabyle flag to be based on the universal Amazigh flag and on 10 March 2015 the Kabyle flag was decided by a Presidential Decree and published in the official gazette of the ANAVAD.

It consists of 6 articles which are as follows:

Article 1.
The Anay Unṣiv Aqvayli, the official flag of Kabylia, shall be as follows.
Article 1.1. The flag is made of the two national colours, arranged in vertical stripes of equal dimensions, so that azure (liberty blue) is at hoist and or (Kabylia yellow) is at fly.
Article 1.2. The proportions of the flag are 3:5 - 3 units for the hoist and 5 units for the fly, the base unit being the height of letter Aza.
Article 1.3. The belonging of Kabylia to the Amazigh great family is highlighted by a letter Aza Gules (red for life and aspiration to serve the homeland), centered at equal distance of the flag's top and bottom and at equal distance of the flag's lateral borders.
Article 1.4. The letter Aza is supported, all along its height and starting from its base, by two crossed olive branches. The lozenge leaves are ten per branch, by pairs, except at the top and bottom; they are representing in turn with two circles apart from each other, forming eight olives per branch, emphasizing the attachment of the Kabyles to the olive-tree, their nourishing tree. The branch on the blue stripe is yellow while the branch on the golden stripe is blue.

Article 2.
The specimen attached to this Decree is the definitive model of the flag.

Article 3.
The flag described in the previous Articles, whose specimen is attached to this Decree, is proclaimed Anay Unṣiv Aqvayli.
Article 3.1. The flag shall be the Kabyle national emblem until the election of a Kabyle Constituent Assembly, which will decide of its preservation or re-assessment.
Article 3.2. The Kabyle flag shall be hoisted in all official meetings of the ANAVAD, of the MAK and of the ANAVAD Network.
Article 3.3. The Kabyle official flag shall be hoisted in all demonstrations of the resistance of the Kabyle people to the Algerian colonial power.

Article 4.
Kabylia has two brother flags: its proper official flag, prescribed by this Decree, and the flag common to all the Amazigh Race, elaborated by the Berber Academy and called the "Amazigh flag".

Article 5.
The members of the Kabyle Provisional Government are commissioned, everyone in his domain of competence, to officially use the flag and to exploit its colours in the logotype of their respective services.

Article 6: This decree is promulgated in the Official Journal of Anavad.

Older Kabyle flag 

The older Kabyle flag is a cultural and national flag proposed for the Kabyle people, a Berber ethnic group native to Kabylia in northern Algeria. It is composed of six horizontal stripes (azure, green, yellow, green, and azure). In the centre, the flag is charged with a green letter Z in the Tifinagh alphabet (ⵣ), which represents the Berber resistance, freedom and the Kabyle language.

Each colour of the flag refers to an element of Tamazgha, a territory inhabited by the Berbers (corresponding to the north of Africa). The azure represents the rivers and valleys of the Mediterranean Sea, the green represents the plains and verdant mountains, and the yellow represents the Kabyle people.

References 

Flags of indigenous peoples
Flags of Algeria
Flags introduced in 2015